Vojvodina League South is a section of the Serbian Zone Leagues, Serbia's fourth football league. The league is operated by the Football Association of Vojvodina.

Vojvodina League South consisted of 16 clubs from South Bačka District and Syrmia District who played each other in a double round-robin league, with each club playing the other club home and away. At the end of the season the top club was promoted to Serbian League Vojvodina.

Champions history

See also
Serbia national football team
Serbian SuperLiga
Serbian First League
Serbian League
Serbian Zone League

References
Vojvođanska liga "Jug", SrbijaSport.net

Football in Vojvodina
Vo